Laguna del Negro Francisco is a lake in the Atacama Region of Chile and the southernmost closed lake in the country. A peninsula, probably formed by a moraine and subsequently modified by wind-driven accumulation of sand, separates the lake into a north-northwesterly and a south-southeasterly half with different colour and water composition.

The lake is of tectonic origin and lies within a basin bordered by mountain ranges to the east and the west and two volcanoes north and south. It formed when the Astaburuaga River was redirected into the lake basin from the east, and this river is also its main source of water. Water levels have fluctuated over the last 6,000 years and the lake is currently in a period of low water level. In 1996 the lake was classified as a Ramsar site and it currently lies within the Nevado Tres Cruces National Park. In the past there were plans to redirect water flowing into the lake to the Copiapó River; presently a mining company holds water rights to the Astaburuaga River.

Geography and geomorphology 

A National Forest Corporation building is close to the southwestern shore of the lake. The area has been called a "scenic beauty".

The peninsula was formed either by wind-driven accumulation of sand as a sandbank or as a moraine left by a former glaciation. Under present-day water levels, the sandbank separates the lake into two parts with different water composition: The southern part has fresher water and thus has a different colour than the saline northern part, as wetlands formed in the southern part.

The land around the lake is formed by alluvial fans and in the eastern sector by alluvial deposits such as gravels, sands and silts.

The Astaburuaga River enters the lake on its eastern shore; it originates on the mountains east of Laguna del Negro Francisco where it is nourished by snowmelt. Other tributaries are the Quebrada Azufre in the northwest, Rio de la Sal in the northeast and Rio La Gallina in the southwest; the tributaries of Laguna del Negro Francisco feature wetlands and marsh vegetation has developed at the mouth of the Astaburuaga.

Hydrology and biology 

The lake is polymictic, meaning that the water in the lake is usually layered but mixes over several times in the year. Aragonite, calcite, dolomite, gypsum and halite precipitate out of the water. In sediments remnants of characeae, diatoms, ostracods and Ruppia have been found; today only one ostracod species persists in the lake. Flamingos exist in the area and the lake is an important site for birds.

The Astaburuaga River is the principal inflow; other creeks that enter the lake and groundwater play only a minor role. In addition, some water from the Astaburuaga River flows into the Cíenaga Redonda basin rather than Laguna del Negro Francisco; presently, an alluvial cone separates the Astaburuaga River in the Valle Ancho gorge from the Salar de Maricunga/ Cíenaga Redonda watershed.

The lake has no outlet and is the southernmost closed basin in Chile; however during former lake level highstands the lake overflowed at  into the Salar de Maricunga. The lake was once thought to be the source of the Copiapó River.

Geology 

On these sides normal faults border the depression which is closed to the north and the south by the Quaternary volcanoes Copiapó and Jotabeche, respectively. Oligocene to Pliocene andesites of the Negro Francisco Formation and Quaternary sediments cover the depression, the latter especially in the east. The depression extends past these volcanoes to the Salar de Pedernales and the Salar de Maricunga;

Climate and life 

Evaporation is about six times larger than precipitation. The region is windy and is considered to be a cold desert.

Vegetation is scarce at these altitudes and is classified as steppe vegetation. Animals found in the region include guanacos, pumas, vicuñas and vizcachas, while birds include the Andean goose, three flamingo species Andean gull, Baird's sandpiper, crested duck and horned coot; in total there are about 17 bird species. The area is a protected area as part of the Nevado Tres Cruces National Park and was declared a Ramsar site in 1996, a site of international importance to waterbirds.

Lacustrine history 

In the past, the Astaburuaga River did flow to the Salar de Maricunga; tectonic subsidence of the Negro Francisco Basin eventually led to a river capture involving a former tributary of the Astaburuaga reversing into the Negro Francisco basin and finally capturing the Astaburuaga itself. This event is responsible for the formation of Laguna del Negro Francisco within the basin, as without the Astaburuaga's input there would not be enough water to sustain a permanent lake.

The maximum surface area of the lake reached . A wet period occurred in northern Chile, northwestern Argentina and the Bolivian Altiplano during the so-called "Lake Tauca phase", and in the climatically Mediterranean parts of Chile it ended together with the Pleistocene for not yet clear reasons. Underwater shorelines also exist, indicating that at times the lake level was lower than today.

During the Holocene, the lake at times turned into a salt pan which only occasionally filled with water, such as between 6,000 and 3,800 years before present. Starting 3,600 years ago, a large wet period in the region made the lake grow in size and become less saline, with brackish conditions established between 3,000 and 1,800 years ago. During this wet period, glaciers in the region expanded due to the increased availability of moisture and peat bogs formed in valleys.

After 1,800 years before present, the lake became saltier again, either because of salt accumulation or because the lake shrank; the latter possibility is more likely. More recent fluctuations have occurred as well; a dry period may be associated with the little ice age. Between 1985 and 2016, glacier coverage declined by about 32%. In 2012-2015 environmental degradation in the area has become apparent, accompanied by a shrinkage of water surfaces and dropping groundwater levels.

Human use 

In prehistory, first pre-ceramic hunter-gatherers and later ceramics-using people who also engaged in horticulture were active in the area of the Astaburuaga River and the Laguna del Negro Francisco. The Inca were active in the valleys south and southwest from Laguna del Negro Francisco and also on the Copiapó and Jotabeche.

A 1921 publication mentioned a project to divert waters of the Astaburuaga River for irrigation purposes. Later, projects were devised which envisaged capturing the discharge into the lake in a canal and transfer the water through a tunnel into the Figueroa River, (one of the headwaters of the Copiapó River;) or to divert the Astaburuaga River into the Salar de Maricunga and from there into the Copiapó River catchment. The waters of the lake itself are not suited for either drinking or irrigation purposes.

Notes

References

Sources 

 
 
 
 
 
 
 
 

Negro Francisco